Argyrocheila inundifera is a butterfly in the family Lycaenidae. It is found in the Democratic Republic of the Congo (Lualaba), Uganda, western Kenya and north-western Tanzania. Its habitat consists of primary forests.

References

Butterflies described in 1933
Poritiinae